Breeding is sexual reproduction that produces offspring, usually animals or plants. It can only occur between a male and a female animal or plant.

Breeding may refer to:
 Animal husbandry, through selected specimens such as dogs, horses, and rabbits
 Breeding in the wild, the natural process of reproduction in the animal kingdom
 Sexual reproduction of plants
 Plant breeding, through specimens selected by humans for desirable traits

Science 
 Breeding refers to nuclear transmutations that produce fuel for further reactions, in a breeder reactor to become fissile material or in a fusion reactor to produce tritium, see

Biology 
 Breeding (sex act)
 Breeding back, a breeding effort to re-assemble extinct breed genes
 Breeding pair, bonded animals who cooperate to produce offspring
 Breeding program, a planned breeding of animals or plants
 Breeding season, the period during each year when a species reproduces
 Captive breeding, raising plants or animals in zoos or other controlled conditions
 Cooperative breeding, the raising of the young using non-parental care givers
 Crossbreeding, the process of breeding an animal with purebred parents of two different breeds, varieties, or populations
 Mating
 Preservation breeding, a selection practice to preserve bloodlines
 Selective breeding, an animal selection practice to encourage chosen qualities
 Smart breeding, a plant selection practice to encourage chosen qualities

People 
 James Floyd Breeding (1901–1977), U.S. Congressman from Kansas
 Marv Breeding (1934–2006), 1960s U.S. Major League Baseball player

Media 
 Breeding (EP), 2007 album by Dirty Little Rabbits
 Breeding Death, 2000 album by Bloodbath
 Breeding the Spawn, 1993 album by Suffocation
 Dust Breeding, 2001 Doctor Who television series audio play

Places 
 Breeding, Kentucky, a town in the United States

See also 
 Copulation (zoology)
 Good breeding (disambiguation)
 Hybrid (biology), breeding between dissimilar parents
 Inbreeding, breeding between close relatives
 Manners, the unenforced standards of human conduct
 Outbreeding depression, reduced fitness from breeding of unrelated individuals
 Purebred